Pekka Saarelainen (18 August 1868 – 16 May 1933) was a Finnish farmer and politician, born in Pielisjärvi. He was a member of the Parliament of Finland, representing the Finnish Party from 1909 to 1910 and the Agrarian League from 1913 to 1922 and again from 1924 to 1930.

References

1868 births
1933 deaths
People from Lieksa
People from Kuopio Province (Grand Duchy of Finland)
Finnish Party politicians
Centre Party (Finland) politicians
Members of the Parliament of Finland (1909–10)
Members of the Parliament of Finland (1913–16)
Members of the Parliament of Finland (1916–17)
Members of the Parliament of Finland (1917–19)
Members of the Parliament of Finland (1919–22)
Members of the Parliament of Finland (1924–27)
Members of the Parliament of Finland (1927–29)
Members of the Parliament of Finland (1929–30)
People of the Finnish Civil War (White side)